George Neville, Duke of Bedford (1465 – 4 May 1483) was an English nobleman, a scion of the House of Neville. At birth, he was likely heir to great wealth, but due to the political failure of his father and uncle, he inherited very little.

He was the son of John Neville, Earl of Northumberland (and later Marquess Montagu) and a nephew of Richard Neville, 16th Earl of Warwick. George's mother was Isobel Ingoldsthorpe, only daughter and heiress of Sir Edmund Ingoldsthorpe and Joan Tiptoft.

At birth, George was the likely or possible heir to considerable property. Most definite were the property of his father's earldom, his mother's Ingoldsthorpe estates, and the more modest jointure of his parents. The latter two were by themselves sufficient to support a baron. He was also heir presumptive (after his father) to the Neville estates of his uncle Warwick. These were entailed to heirs male and the earl had only daughters. Finally, George was likely to inherit (after his mother and grandmother) a third share of the Tiptoft property held by his childless grand-uncle, John Tiptoft, 1st Earl of Worcester, whose sister and heiress Joan was George's maternal grandmother. These inheritances altogether would yield around 4,000 pounds a year, comparable to the 4,500 pounds annual income of the Duke of Clarence, the king's brother and the greatest magnate of the time.

George Neville was made Duke of Bedford in 1470, as the intended husband of Elizabeth of York. The title had lain unused since John of Lancaster, Duke of Bedford, died on 14 September 1435. However, his father and his uncle Warwick rebelled against King Edward IV the following year and were slain. An act of attainder was never passed against them, but George received no inheritance from them or from his maternal ancestors. An act of Parliament in 1475 gave the Neville inheritance in the north of England to Richard, Duke of Gloucester, husband of one of Warwick's daughters. George had a half-interest in the estates of his maternal grandfather, Sir Edmund Ingoldsthorpe, and his maternal grandmother, Joan Tiptoft.

Shortly before he came of age in 1478 he was denied the title of duke by act of Parliament, ostensibly for lack of money to maintain the style of a duke. The title was subsequently given to the infant George of York, the 3rd son of King Edward IV.

Notes

References
  reprinted in his book Richard III and his Rivals.
 

Bedford, George Neville, Duke of Bedford
Bedford, George Neville, Duke of Bedford
201
George
15th-century English people